Wake Up Morocco is a 2006 Moroccan film directed by Narjiss Nejjar. It was screened at the National Film Festival in Tangier and the Marrakesh International Film Festival.

Synopsis 
On an islet off the coast of Casablanca, an old footballer spends his days with his granddaughter Alia, dreaming of the final he could have won if he had not spent the night with a woman. Now old and living on the same islet, the woman dreams of him as well.

Cast 

 Hassan Skalli (old footballer)
 Fatim-Zahra Ibrahimi (Alia)
 Raouia (the fortuneteller)
 Qassem Benhayoun (Jad)
 Fatima Harrandi
 Mourad Zaoui (adult Jad)
 Mohamed Belfquih
 Siham Assif
 Hassan Guessous
 Leila Slimani

References

External links 
 

2006 films
Moroccan drama films
2000s Arabic-language films
2006 drama films